Value criticism (in German Wertkritik) is a social theory which draws its foundation from the Marxian tradition and criticizes the contemporary mode of production. Value criticism was developed partly by critical readings of the traditions of the Frankfurt School and critical theory. Prominent adherents of value criticism include Robert Kurz, Moishe Postone and Jean-Marie Vincent.

Aspects of value criticism
Value criticism takes crucial aspects of Marx's critiques of commodity fetishism, commodities and value, while criticizing Marx's theory of class struggle and historical materialism. As a result, proponents of Value Criticism feel that the working class is not necessarily a revolutionary subject. Instead, it is pointed out that labor has to be understood as a historic specific entity and that criticizing capitalism implies not only criticizing the distribution process in capitalism, but also the capitalistic production process and the productive powers. From this, they conclude that all actually existing "socialisms" thus far have been in essence forms of state-led capitalism (nachholenden Modernisierung), where production still followed capitalistic principles. This interpretation, which rejects the traditional Marxist-Leninist point of view, is defended in the early text from 1999: Manifesto Against Labour.

Feminist turn of the theory
In addition to value criticism, a new branch appeared by the widow of Robert Kurz, Roswitha Scholz. The so-called critique of value-dissociation  (in German called "Wertabspaltungskritik") includes not only precise descriptions of the "abstract and fetishized character of modern domination", but also seeks to explain why irrational attitudes are delegated to women, while men are counted as relatively rational actors in the capitalistic society.

Publications
Publishers of value criticism in Germany are the Krisis group and Exit!, to both of which Robert Kurz made crucial contributions. Much value critical literature has still to be translated into English. Elmar Flatschart from the University of Vienna is also publishing in English for the Exit! group. Moishe Postone and his work "Time, Labor and Social Domination" is often cited by value critics.

See also
Critique of political economy
An Essay on Marxian Economics (1962)

References

 Marxism and the Critique of  Value - Neil Larsen, Mathias Nilges, Josh Robinson, and Nicholas Brow

Further reading 
 Robert Kurz: Der Kollaps der Modernisierung, Reclam, Leipzig 1994, ISBN 3-379-01503-2
 Ernst Lohoff: Der Dritte Weg in den Bürgerkrieg: Jugoslawien und das Ende der nachholenden Modernisierung. Horlemann-Verlag, 1996, ISBN 3-89502-055-9.
 .
 Robert Kurz: Schwarzbuch Kapitalismus. Ein Abgesang auf die Marktwirtschaft. Ullstein, 1999, ISBN 3-548-36308-3.
 Roswitha Scholz: Das Geschlecht des Kapitalismus. Feministische Theorien und die postmoderne Metamorphose des Patriarchats. Horlemann-Verlag, 2000, ISBN 3-89502-100-8.
 Dieter Wolf: Der dialektische Widerspruch im Kapital. Hamburg 2002, ISBN 3-87975-889-1 (dieterwolf.net PDF; 478 kB, Ein Beitrag zur Marxschen Werttheorie).
 Moishe Postone: Zeit, Arbeit und gesellschaftliche Herrschaft. Ca Ira, Freiburg i.Br. 2003, ISBN 3-924627-58-4.
 Holger Schatz: Arbeit als Herrschaft. Die Krise des Leistungsprinzips und seine neoliberale Rekonstruktion. Unrast-Verlag, Münster 2004, ISBN 3-89771-429-9.
 Ernst Lohoff, Norbert Trenkle, Karl-Heinz Lewed, Maria Wölflingseder: Dead Men Working, Unrast, 2004, ISBN 3-89771-427-2.
 Roswitha Scholz: Differenzen der Krise – Krise der Differenzen. Die neue Gesellschaftskritik im globalen Zeitalter und der Zusammenhang von 'Rasse', Klasse, Geschlecht und postmoderner Individualisierung. Horlemann-Verlag, 2005, ISBN 3-89502-195-4.
 Robert Kurz: Das Weltkapital, Tiamat, 2005, ISBN 3-89320-085-1.
 Anselm Jappe: Die Abenteuer der Ware. Für eine neue Wertkritik. Unrast-Verlag, 2005, ISBN 3-89771-433-7.
 Ingo Elbe, Tobias Reichardt, Dieter Wolf: Gesellschaftliche Praxis und ihre wissenschaftliche Darstellung. Beiträge zur Kapital-Diskussion Wissenschaftliche Mitteilungen. Heft 6. Argument Verlag, Hamburg 2008, ISBN 978-3-88619-655-5.
 Robert Kurz: Geld ohne Wert. Grundrisse zu einer Transformation der Kritik der politischen Ökonomie. Horlemann Verlag, Berlin 2012, ISBN 978-3-89502-343-9.
 Tomasz Konicz: Kapitalkollaps. Die finale Krise der Weltwirtschaft. Hamburg 2016.
 .

Critique 
 Jürgen Albohn, Theorie ohne revolutionäre Praxis ist Opium fürs Volk - Eine Kritik der Wertkritik, Grundrisse Heft 16. auch ausführlicher: http://www.materialien.org/texte/papers/albohn-wertkritik.pdf
 Jürgen Behre, Nadja Rakowitz (2001), Automatisches Subjekt? Zur Bedeutung des Kapitalbegriffs bei Marx.
 Alexander Gallas (2003), Marx als Monist? Versuch einer Kritik der Wertkritik. (PDF; 740 kB)
 Ingo Elbe (2007), Marxismus-Mystizismus – oder: die Verwandlung der Marxschen Theorie in deutsche Ideologie. Prodomo Heft 5, S. 11–18.
 Gerhard Hanloser, Karl Reitter (2008), Der bewegte Marx. Eine einführende Kritik des Zirkulationsmarxismus. Unrast Verlag, ISBN 978-3-89771-486-1.
 Karl Reitter (2006), Das Kapital wieder lesen. Eine alternative zur wertkritischen Interpretation. Grundrisse Heft 17, S. 13–27.
 Dieter Wolf: Elmar Flatscharts „wertkritische“ Auseinandersetzung mit Ingo Elbes Kapitalinterpretation (PDF; 400 kB)
 GegenStandpunkt: R. Kurz: „Schwarzbuch Kapitalismus – ein Abgesang auf die Marktwirtschaft“ – Die Intellektuellenfibel für den Abgesang auf Kapitalismuskritik. GegenStandpunkt 3-2000
 GegenStandpunkt: Was sich mit Marx doch alles anstellen läßt!. GegenStandpunkt 4-1996
 GegenStandpunkt: Der Untergang des Abendlands – linksherum. GegenStandpunkt 2-1992

Weblinks 
 Streifzüge Wertkritischer Verein und Magazin aus Österreich
 Wertkritik und Krisentheorie Wertkritische Gruppe aus Österreich
 Was ist Wertkritik? Interview mit Ernst Lohoff und Robert Kurz
 Wildcat-Kritik an der Wertkritik
 Michael Sommer/Dieter Wolf: Das Kapital als automatisches Subjekt und die Einheit von Darstellung und Kritik (PDF; 250 kB)
 Dieter Wolf: Zum Übergang vom Geld ins Kapital in den Grundrissen, im Urtext und im Kapital (PDF; 391 kB)
 Josef S. Falkinger: Herrn Robert Kurzens Umwälzung des Marxismus – Kritik der wert-kritischen Kritik www.derfunke.at (PDF 205 kB)
Critical theory
Criticism
Frankfurt School
Marxism
Social concepts
Theory of value (economics)